The 1935 West Virginia Mountaineers football team was an American football that represented West Virginia University as an independent during the 1935 college football season. In its second season under head coach Charles Tallman, the team compiled a 3–4–2 record and outscored opponents by a total of 129 to 96. The team played its home games at Mountaineer Field in Mountaineer Field in Morgantown, West Virginia. Joe Stydahar was the team captain.

Schedule

References

West Virginia Mountaineers football seasons
West Virginia
West Virginia Mountaineers football